Everett Shapiro (December 5, 1917 – January 1, 2002) was an American orthodontist who was a past president of the American Board of Orthodontics and American Journal of Orthodontics and Dentofacial Orthopedics.

Life
He was born in Dorchester, Massachusetts on December 5, 1917. He attended the University of Massachusetts and obtained his bachelor's degree in 1940. He received his dental degree from Harvard School of Dental Medicine in 1944. He then served in the United States Army for two years where he became a captain. He then obtained his certificate in orthodontics from Tufts Dental School in 1949. He became part of the faculty of the Department of Orthodontics after graduation until 1960. In 1960 he became the Chair of the Orthodontic Program until his retirement in 1998. Dr. Shapiro was Professor Emeritus in the Department of Orthodontics at Tufts University School of Dental Medicine.

There is an award dedicated for Dr. Shapiro's contributions to the field of Orthodontics named Everett Shapiro Award in Diagnosis and Treatment Planning. There is also an Everett Shapiro Library dedicated in the Department of Orthodontics at Tufts Dental School.

He died at the age of 84 due to natural causes in 2002. He is buried at Lindwood Memorial Park, Randolph, Massachusetts.

Positions held
American Board of Orthodontics, President
Northeastern Society of Orthodontists, President
Eastern Component of Edward H. Angle Society, President
American Journal of Orthodontics & Dentofacial Orthopedics, President

References

1917 births
2002 deaths
20th-century dentists
American dentistry academics
Burials in Massachusetts
Harvard School of Dental Medicine alumni
American orthodontists
People from Dorchester, Massachusetts
Tufts University faculty
University of Massachusetts Amherst alumni
United States Army officers
Tufts University alumni